Marek Baraniecki (born June 16, 1954) is a Polish science fiction writer and journalist. He graduated in environmental engineering. In 1985 he published a short story collection Głowa Kasandry, and for a novel with the same title he was given the Janusz A. Zajdel Award.

Marek Baraniecki was born on June 16, 1954 in Gliwice, Poland. A graduate of Silesian University of Technology, for several years he worked as an environmental engineer before committing himself to journalism and writing. His literary début was "Karlgoro godzina 18" ("Karlgoro, 6pm"), a short story published in Fantastyka magazine.

The best-known of his works however is a novel titled Głowa Kasandry (Cassandra's Head) published for the first time in 1985 and instantly awarded the Janusz A. Zajdel Award. Set in a post-apocalyptic world, in 2004 Głowa Kasandry was voted by Gazeta Wyborcza'''s readers one of the top seven post-apocalyptic novels of all times, alongside the works by Jack London, Herbert Wells and Stephen King.

Currently Głowa Kasandry is being prepared for cinema under a working title Cassandra. Science fiction drama. 

Sources

Andrzej Niewiadomski, Antoni Smuszkiewicz, Leksykon polskiej literatury fantastycznonaukowej'', Wydawnictwo Poznańskie, Poznań 1990, 

Polish science fiction writers
1954 births
Living people
People from Gliwice